Milton Keynes Development Corporation (MKDC) was a development corporation operating from 1967 to 1992 oversee the planning and early development of Milton Keynes, a new town midway between London and Birmingham.

Establishment
MKDC established on 23 January 1967 to provide the vision and execution of a "new city",  that would be the modern interpretation of the garden city movement concepts first expressed by Ebenezer Howard 60 years earlier.

Situated in the north of Buckinghamshire near the borders with Northamptonshire and Bedfordshire, it would be a "city in the trees"the planning guideline was "no building higher than the highest tree" at a time when multi-storey flats and office blocks were dominating the redevelopment of most inner city areas and many large towns, as well as new housing estates.

The aims that MKDC set out in "The Plan for Milton Keynes" implied that the designers would learn from the mistakes made in the earlier new towns and build a city that people would be proud to call their home. On that date, the area within the designated area was home to some 40,000 people in the existing towns and villages. It was placed where it would have a direct road (the M1) and rail link (the West Coast Main Line) with the capital city, London, and the second city Birmingham; both 50–60 miles away.

Personnel
Following publication of the Draft Master Plan for Milton Keynes, the government appointed Lord Campbell of Eskan ("Jock" Campbell) to chair the board of the new Development Corporation.  For the critical local consultation period, Walter Ismay became the corporation's first Chief Executive.  The Board invited as consultants Richard Llewellyn Davies and partners, who produced the overall development plan, with its grid pattern of distributor roads at roughly  intervals. When the planning enquiries were over, it was time for a different type of CEO and Fred Roche took over in 1970. Llewellyn Davies, with colleagues Walter Bor, John de Monchaux and Sue de Monchaux continued to contribute to the development of strategy.,

In 1980, Frank Henshaw took over from Fred Roche. Lord Campbell was succeeded by Sir Henry Chilver in 1983.

Promotional events
MKDC promoted the "Homeworld" exhibition in 1981, thirty-five houses showcasing "the latest developments in housing from international designers, architects and builders", and Energy World, a demonstration project of 51 low-energy houses completed in 1986.

Supersession
The Government wound up MKDC in 1992 after 25 years, transferring control to the Commission for New Towns, latterly part of English Partnerships, which subsequently merged with the Housing Corporation to become the Homes and Communities Agency (HCA).  Control over design passed to Milton Keynes Partnership which remained a major landowner in the city. Design criteria became more similar to those being applied by the HCA on sites it owned across the country. Public parks were transferred to the Milton Keynes Parks Trust, a registered charity.

See also
 History of Milton Keynes#Milton Keynes Development Corporation: designing a city for 250,000 people
 New Towns Acts

Sources

Notes

References

Further reading
 
 "BIG PLANS" by John de Monchaux (PDF)  OpenCourseware transcript of 2003 MIT lecture about Milton Keynes planning
 

History of Milton Keynes
Interested parties in planning in England
1992 disestablishments in England
Government agencies established in 1969
Development Corporations of the United Kingdom
Urban design
Government agencies disestablished in 1992